ScotlandWhisky, also known as the Scotch Whisky Tourism Initiative, was launched in 2003 by Jim Wallace MSP, the then Deputy First Minister of Scotland, and Ian Good, Chairman of the Scotch Whisky Association.  The project is a partnership between the public and private sectors, with the aim of exploring where the tourism and Scotch whisky industries can work together to realize mutual commercial benefits. It is financed by the Scotch Whisky Association, The Scotch Whisky Experience, Scottish Enterprise, Highlands and Islands Enterprise, and VisitScotland.

External links

ScotlandWhisky official website

References

Tourism in Scotland
Scotch whisky
2003 establishments in Scotland
Tourism campaigns